Nenadović (Cyrillic script: Ненадовић) is a Serbian surname, derived from a masculine given name Nenad. It may refer to:
Aleksa Nenadović, Serbian Archpriest
Jakov Nenadović, Serbian Duke and revolutionary politician
Ljubomir Nenadović, Serbian writer, poet, translator, diplomat and politician
Mateja Nenadović, Serbian Archpriest and Prime minister
Pavle Nenadović, Serbian Orthodox Metropolitan
Persida Nenadović, Princess Consort of Serbia
Sima Nenadović, Serbian voivode in the Second Serbian Uprising
Stefan Nenadović, footballer
Uroš Nenadović, footballer

Serbian surnames

de:Nenadović
ru:Ненадович